Michael Harvey is an American author, journalist, and documentary filmmaker.

Career

Harvey is the author of seven crime novels, The Chicago Way, The Fifth Floor, The Third Rail, We All Fall Down, The Innocence Game, The Governor's Wife, and Brighton.  Harvey is also an investigative reporter, documentary producer and co-creator, producer and executive producer of A&E's groundbreaking forensic series, Cold Case Files. Harvey's investigative journalism and documentary work has won multiple news Emmys and CableACE awards, numerous national and international film festival awards, a CINE Golden Eagle, two Prime-Time Emmy nominations, as well as an Academy Award nomination. Harvey was also selected by the Chicago Tribune as Chicagoan of the Year in Literature for 2011.

Harvey holds a bachelor's degree, magna cum laude with honors, in classical languages from the College of the Holy Cross, a law degree with honors from Duke University and a master's degree in journalism from Northwestern University. Harvey is currently an adjunct professor at Northwestern's Medill School of Journalism. Harvey was born in Boston, graduated from Boston Latin and lives in Chicago. He owns an Irish bar in Chicago, The Hidden Shamrock.

Books

P.I Michael Kelly series:

The Governor’s Wife, Knopf, 2015.
We All Fall Down, Knopf, 2011.
The Third Rail, Knopf, 2010.
The Fifth Floor, Knopf, 2008.
The Chicago Way, Knopf, 2007.

stand-alone:

Pulse, Ecco, 2018.
Brighton, Ecco, 2016.
The Innocence Game, Knopf, 2013.

Awards

Chicago Tribune 2011 Person of the Year – Literature.
Two Primetime Emmy Nominations for Best Original Non-Fiction Series
Academy Award Nomination – Best Short Feature Documentary
Columbus International Film Festival Chris Award
CINE – Golden Eagle Award
Houston World Film Festival – Gold Medal
New York Festivals – Gold Medal
National CableACE Award – Best News Special
New York Festivals – World Medal, International Division
National CableACE Award – Best News Special
Regional Emmy Award – Best Feature Series
Columbus International Film Festival Bronze Plaque
New York Festivals Gold Medal
Five Regional Emmy Awards
National Easter Seal Award, Best Feature

References

Living people
College of the Holy Cross alumni
American crime fiction writers
Duke University School of Law alumni
Northwestern University faculty
Medill School of Journalism alumni
American documentary filmmakers
Writers from Chicago
Film producers from Illinois
American investigative journalists
American male novelists
Boston Latin School alumni
Novelists from Illinois
American male non-fiction writers
Year of birth missing (living people)